This is a list of airlines of Quebec which have an air operator's certificate issued by Transport Canada, the country's civil aviation authority. These are airlines that are based in Quebec.

Current airlines

Defunct airlines

References

Aviation in Quebec
Quebec
Airlines